Terence Lewis (born 10 April 1975) is an Indian dancer and choreographer. He is known for judging the reality dance shows Dance India Dance (2009–2012) and Nach Baliye (2012–2017). He runs his "Terence Lewis Contemporary Dance Company" in Mumbai and holds dance workshops both in India and abroad. 

He has choreographed in Bollywood films like, Lagaan (2001), Jhankaar Beats (2003) and Goliyon Ki Raasleela Ram-Leela (2013), apart from doing musicals, stage shows, ads, music videos and national and international dance competitions. He was a contestant on Fear Factor: Khatron Ke Khiladi 3 (2010) on Colors TV. He was last seen as a judge on India's Best Dancer (2020–2021).

Early life and training 
Terence Lewis was raised in Mumbai in a Mangalorean Catholic family of Javier Lewis and Teresa Lewis. Lewis is youngest of eight siblings. He studied and started dancing in St. Theresa's Boys High School, and St. Xavier's College, Mumbai. He is graduated from IHM Mumbai, formerly known as Dadar Catering College. He is trained in jazz, ballet and contemporary dance at the Alvin Ailey American Dance Theater and the Martha Graham Center of Contemporary Dance in New York.

Career
Lewis is a choreographer in several Bollywood films. He has also choreographed a number of stage shows, Indian contemporary performances, corporate launches, broadway westend musicals, feature films and music videos. Lewis won the 2002 American Choreography Award for choreographing the songs of the movie Lagaan along with Saroj Khan, Raju Khan, Ganesh Hegde and Vaibhavi Merchant. He is the first Indian to receive the Dance Web Europe Scholarship, representing India in Vienna, Austria. He has also choreographed for movies like What's Your Raashee?, Jhankaar Beats, Naach, etc.

Dance India Dance
Terence Lewis has been a judge on Dance India Dance for its 1st three seasons. In the first season, his contestant Alisha Singh came in second place. In the second season, his contestant Shakti Mohan won the contest. In the third season, his contestants Pradeep Gurung and Raghav Juyal came in second place behind Rajasmita Kar and third place respectively. The most shocking event to happen during the season 3 auditions was the participation of his former assistant, who did so without informing Lewis. Lewis did not judge his performance and left it to the other two judges, who selected him for the next round.

Fear Factor: Khatron Ke Khiladi 3
In 2010, Lewis was a contestant on Colors TV's Fear Factor: Khatron Ke Khiladi 3 hosted by Priyanka Chopra. The 3rd season for 13 boys was held in Copacabana, Brazil. He was eliminated in the 11th episode of the show.

Filmography
Lewis has done more than 25 movies and musical albums. He is well known for his work in Lagaan, Goliyon Ki Raasleela Ram-Leela and Gold. In 2020, a biopic documentary about his own life Terence Lewis, Indian Man directed by the French director Pierre X. Garnier was released.

Television

References

External links
 
 

1975 births
Living people
Indian male dancers
Indian Roman Catholics
Indian film choreographers
Indian dance teachers
Participants in Indian reality television series
Dance India Dance
Indian choreographers
Contemporary dance choreographers
Indian contemporary dancers
Alumni of the Manchester Business School
Dancers from Maharashtra
Artists from Mumbai
Fear Factor: Khatron Ke Khiladi participants